The 2013 ISPS Handa World Cup of Golf is a golf tournament that was played 21–24 November at Royal Melbourne Golf Club in Melbourne, Australia. It was the 57th World Cup. The format changed from being a team event to being primarily an individual event with a team component. Sixty players from 34 countries competed in the individual tournament and 26 teams (two-player combined score) competed for the team prize. The total purse was US$8 million, $7 million for the individual competition and $1 million for the teams. The event was a 72-hole stroke play tournament. Official World Golf Ranking points were award for the first time in the World Cup.

Australia's Jason Day shot a final round 70 to win the individual tournament. Day teamed with Adam Scott to win the team prize.

Qualification
The field was based on the Official World Golf Ranking on 23 September 2013. The top 15 players in the rankings were eligible with a limit of four players per country. After the top 15, players were eligible with a limit of two players per country until the field of 60 players was filled. The individual portion was similar to what will be used at the 2016 Summer Olympics, except that England, Scotland, and Wales fielded teams instead of a single Great Britain team in the Olympics.

Players
The table below lists the players together with their World Ranking at the time of the tournament.

Final leaderboards

Individual competition

Team competition

Notes and references

External links

World Cup (men's golf)
Golf tournaments in Australia
Sports competitions in Melbourne
World Cup Golf
World Cup Golf
World Cup golf